CVN may refer to:

Cohen Veterans Network, a not for profit series of mental health clinics for veterans and military families.
Central Venous Nutrition, in parenteral nutrition
 Cable Value Network, a 1980s cable shopping channel, purchased in 1989 by QVC
 Charpy V-notch Number (Charpy Energy), the output of a Charpy impact test
 Card Verification Number for credit cards (3 or 4 digits on the back or front of the card)
 Courtroom View Network, a media company that webcasts trials
 The constellation Canes Venatici, CVn, standard astronomical abbreviation
 CVN (Carrier, Volplane, Nuclear), a United States Navy hull classification symbol for nuclear aircraft carriers
 Crime Victim Notification (computerised system)
 Countervandalism Network, a network of volunteers dedicated to reducing vandalism on Wikimedia Foundation wikis
Clovis Municipal Airport, an airport located in Clovis, New Mexico with IATA code CVN
Chinese VLBI Network, a network of large antennas and part of European VLBI Network (EVN).